Victorian gothic may refer to:
 
 Gothic fiction, a type of fiction writing that began in the Romantic period
 Gothic Revival architecture, a type of architecture based on a mediaeval style revived in the Romantic period